Lajše is a settlement in the Municipality of Železniki in the Upper Carniola region of Slovenia.

Name
The name of the settlement was changed from Lajše to Selške Lajše in 1953. The name Lajše was restored in 1998.

Church
The local church is dedicated to Saint Gertrude.

References

External links
Lajše at Geopedia

Populated places in the Municipality of Železniki